San Gabriel is a town and municipality in the Suchitepéquez department of Guatemala.

References

Municipalities of the Suchitepéquez Department